Richard FitzWilliam may refer to:

Richard FitzWilliam, 7th Viscount FitzWilliam (1745–1816), Irish Viscount, benefactor and musical antiquarian
Richard FitzWilliam, 6th Viscount FitzWilliam (1711–1776), Irish peer and property developer
Richard FitzWilliam, 5th Viscount FitzWilliam (c. 1677–1743), Irish nobleman and MP

See also
Richard Fitzwilliams, PR consultant